Lenesornis is a genus of enantiornithine birds which lived during the Late Cretaceous about 90 Ma and is known from fossils found in the Bissekty Formation in the Kyzyl Kum, Uzbekistan.

References

Bissekty Formation
Euenantiornitheans
Fossils of Uzbekistan
Fossil taxa described in 1996
Late Cretaceous birds of Asia
Prehistoric bird genera
Turonian life